Photopectoralis aureus, commonly known as the golden ponyfish or false toothed ponyfish, is a marine fish native to the Western Pacific from Taiwan south to Indonesia as well as to the Gulf of Thailand, Timor Sea, and the Arafura Sea. It grows to  TL. This species was first formally described in 1972 as Leiognathus aureus by the Japanese ichthyologists Tokiharu Abe (1911-1996) and Yata Haneda (1907-1995) with the type locality given as Ambon fish market on Ambon Island. It is the type species of the genus Photopectoralis which was delineated by Sparks, Dunlap & W. L. Smith in 2005.

References

Fish of the Pacific Ocean
Fish of Australia
Fish of Indonesia
Fish of Papua New Guinea
Fish of the Philippines
Fish of Singapore
Fish of Taiwan
Fish of Thailand
Bioluminescent fish
Taxa named by Tokiharu Abe
Taxa named by Yata Haneda
Fish described in 1972
Leiognathidae